Director of nursing may refer to

Director of nursing (long term care facility)
Director of nursing (other uses)